Carla Fernandes (born 31 December 1973) is an Angolan swimmer. She competed in two events at the 1988 Summer Olympics.

References

External links

1973 births
Living people
Angolan female swimmers
Olympic swimmers of Angola
Swimmers at the 1988 Summer Olympics
Place of birth missing (living people)